Margarete Ulrike Augusta Marie Karoline Elsa Reger (née von Bagenski; previously von Bercken, 25 October 1870 – 3 May 1951) was a German writer, the wife of the pianist and composer Max Reger, whose memory she kept alive by founding an archive, the Max-Reger-Institute and a foundation, all dedicated to him and his work. The foundation is now named after her.

Life 
Born as Margarete Ulrike Augusta Marie Karoline Elsa von Bagenski in Kolberg the daughter of Captain Ernst Hugo Robert von Bagenski (or von Bagensteg or von Bagensky) and his wife Auguste (or Augusta) Karoline Josepha Marie Theresia Fanny Olga (née Baroness von Seckendorff-Aberdar zur Welt), she married in 1887 Franz von Bercken. She met Max Reger in 1893, when she spent a summer vacation in  Wiesbaden, where she took voice lessons with him. In 1899 she divorced her husband, but first rejected Reger's courting. He composed many songs between 1899 and 1902. They married on 7 December 1902 in Bad Boll and lived in Munich. As she was divorced and a Protestant, the Catholic Reger was excommunicated. Elsa's mother Auguste also moved to Munich where she died in 1904. Elsa followed the composer, whose fame increased, to Leipzig, Meiningen and Jena. She took care of his students as the Regermutter (Reger mother). The couple adopted two daughters, Marie-Martha Heyer (1905–1969), adopted in 1908 as Christa Reger, and Selma Charlotte Meinig (1907–1963), adopted as Lotti Reger in 1909. The relationship was troubled by Reger's depressions and alcoholism.

After her husband's death in 1916, she took care of their daughters and also kept his memory alive. She founded in 1947 the Max-Reger-Institute with a foundation which was later named after her.

She died in Bonn in 1951. According to her wish, she was buried on the Alter Friedhof close to Clara Schumann and Maria Magdalena van Beethoven, Beethoven's mother.

References

External links 
 Elsa Reger fembio.org

20th-century German women writers
1870 births
1951 deaths
People from Kołobrzeg
20th-century German non-fiction writers
German women non-fiction writers
German autobiographers
Women autobiographers